The 2005 Segunda División Peruana, the second division of Peruvian football (soccer), was played by 12 teams. The tournament winner, Olímpico Somos Perú was promoted to the Copa Perú. The last places, AELU, Virgen de Chapi, Unión de Campeones and Somos Aduanas were relegated. The tournament was played on a home-and-away round-robin basis.

Results

Standings

Notes

External links
 RSSSF

Peruvian Segunda División seasons
Peru2
2005 in Peruvian football